Thomas Clifford (14 August 1874 – 19 January 1917) was a Scottish professional footballer who played as a centre half in the Football League for Glossop. He also played in the Scottish League for Motherwell and Ayr.

Personal life 
Clifford served as a private in the Royal Scots Fusiliers during the First World War and was killed in France on 19 January 1917. He is commemorated on the Thiepval Memorial.

Career statistics

References 

Scottish footballers
1917 deaths
British Army personnel of World War I
1874 births
People from Kilbirnie
Royal Scots Fusiliers soldiers
Scottish Football League players
Ayr F.C. players
Association football wing halves
Glossop North End A.F.C. players
Luton Town F.C. players
Beith F.C. players
Motherwell F.C. players
Southern Football League players
English Football League players
British military personnel killed in World War I
Annbank F.C. players
Manchester United F.C. players
Celtic F.C. players
Nottingham Forest F.C. players